Pragyan, NIT Trichy is the technical festival of the National Institute of Technology, Tiruchirappalli. Since its inception in 2005, it has been held every year over a period of three and a half days during the months of January, February, or March. Every year, participants from a number of colleges across the country take part in various events conducted as a part of Pragyan, making it one of the largest techno-managerial fests in India. It is also the first student-run organisation in the world and the third overall, next only to the London Olympics and Manchester United to get an ISO 20121:2012 certification for Sustainable Event Management. It also holds the ISO 9001:2015 certification for Quality Management Systems.

History and growth

In 2005, the staff and students of NIT Trichy collaborated to create Pragyan as a technical festival attracting innovation from across the state. Pragyan has since expanded to include teams from over 60 countries taking part in the online events. In recent years, up to 700 volunteers have worked in hosting the event.

Events

Pragyan conducts a variety of technical and cultural events throughout the year, including an annual technical festival that attracts participants from all over India. The festival features competitions in coding and robotics, as well as guest lectures from industry leaders. The goal is to promote technical and cultural education and provide opportunities for students to showcase their skills, creativity, and innovation. Pragyan also conducts workshops, seminars, and cultural events such as music, dance, and drama competitions. These events are designed to provide students with a well-rounded educational experience and allow them to explore their interests in technology, culture, and the arts. Pragyan's events are run by students and are open to participation from students across India. Pragyan’s events deal with a broad number of categories and are classified into various clusters. Pragyan 2022 consisted of the following 8 clusters:

Guest lectures series

Each year the fest features lectures from several guest speakers.

The 2015 edition saw the introduction of 'Divergent', an inspirational talk series by youngsters who have made a marked contribution to the society. The speakers at the inaugural edition included Roman Saini, Vishnu Nair, Ajit Narayanan and Kartheeban.

Crossfire
Crossfire is a panel discussion event held during the fest. Crossfire aims to provide a global platform for academia, industry, and the government to interact with the student fraternity. 

In the 2016 edition, the alumni of NITT were called to participate in Alumni Crossfire in which they debated on whether the NIT of the 70s, 80s, 90s or the 2000s which gave had the best experience.

Workshops

Since 2007, Pragyan has featured a series of workshops that have helped participants hone their skills and abilities.

Exhibitions
A number of exhibits are hosted during the fest each year. Giving exposure to students about innovations in various fronts of science and technology, these are looked forward to by the attendees.

Sangam and Ingenium

Sangam

Sangam is an exclusive intra-NITT technical contest involving the display of models and solutions developed by students from various departments. This event, which is held on all four days of Pragyan, provides a platform for students to implement their innovative ideas and earn recognition for the same from other participants, academicians, technocrats, and industrialists.

Ingenium
Ingenium, previously known as Anwesh, is a technical contest exclusively for students from colleges other than NIT Trichy. Giving students a chance to showcase their technical prowess through ideas and inventions, Ingenium strives to reignite the love for science and technology in students.

Infotainment

Since its inception in 2008, the Infotainment aspect of the fest has provided entertainment across genres that include acrobatics, dance, cardistry, illusion, light shows and comedy.

Sponsors and partners

Pragyan is a non-profit organization established in India by students with the goal of advancing technical and cultural education. They hold various events such as technical and cultural festivals, workshops, and lectures. The organization, founded in 2005, is sustained through the support of sponsors from leading companies in the technology and engineering sectors such as Tata Steel, Texas Instruments, State Bank of India, Google, Pepsi, Marrybrown, Indian Oil Corporation, McAfee, National Instruments, Larsen & Toubro and Honeywell. These sponsors financially aid in the organization of events, including expenses for equipment and venue rentals. They also offer prizes and incentives for participants in Pragyan's events. Furthermore, the support from sponsors allows Pragyan to invite industry experts as guest speakers, providing students with opportunities to learn from and network with professionals in their field. For the 2022 edition of Pragyan, the principal sponsors were Salesforce, Agnostiq and Comedy Central.

Pragyan Social Responsibility

In Pragyan 2012, a new wing of the organisation, called the Pragyan Social Responsibility (PSR) was added. A number of initiatives are conducted by the members of this wing targeted at diverse social groups.

Veetukku Oru Vignaani 
A science exhibition for projects by school students, conducted by Puthiya Thalaimurai television network was hosted and managed by Pragyan for the first time in 2016.
In 2017 the exhibition achieved acclamation after a grand state-level final was hosted by Pragyan at NIT Trichy. It received media coverage by Puthiya Thalaimurai with whom Pragyan collaborated to achieve this feat. Students from various schools across the state were invited to attend, participate, and exhibit their models and ideas.

Dhisai 
The event ‘Dhisai’ aimed at educating the school students of Tamil Nadu about the Joint Entrance Examinations (JEE) was first introduced in 2015. Since then every year as a part of Dhisai a mock JEE exam has been conducted annually for the students of class 12 to create awareness about the JEE Examination.
In 2016 information booklets were distributed across schools in all districts of Tamil Nadu and online portals were made available in Tamil, Hindi, and English to benefit eager students. A mock JEE examination was conducted for 12th-grade students throughout Tamil Nadu to provide them with real-time experience in a competitive scenario.
During 2017 Dhisai, the JEE awareness campaign saw a new turn of events as it was conducted this year with help from the Tamil Nadu government. A mock JEE test was conducted in six centers across Tamil Nadu. In 2018, Dhisai was conducted as a five-day event that saw the participation of over 600 students belonging to Trichy and Thanjavur. The 2019 edition of Dhisai consisted of a day-long awareness tour of the NIT Trichy campus, and the visiting students were issued formulae and key booklets.

2021 
GyaanE: This was an online event organized for children of classes eight to ten of SOS children's village orphanage in Bhopal. Insights about different careers (automobile, telecommunication, etc.) were given to students. An interactive workshop on arts and crafts was also conducted, which ended with an interactive Q&A session about career guidance.

Career Compass: In collaboration with the Manasadhara platform, a psychometric test was conducted for 900+ school and college students, and they learnt to understand their test results.

Young Techie 2.0: Under diverse domains like agriculture, Healthcare, Energy and Environment, Entrepreneurship and Defense, this event prompted school students to submit their scientific models. The technical clubs of NIT-T mentored the finalists for four weeks, and the winners were announced in Pragyan's valediction event.

Inspire-It: It was a talk conducted for school students with a minimal entry fee of ₹50. The event covered many aspects, including hobby development and leadership skills. The entry fee amount was donated to "All the Children", an NGO which targets 10,000 people with campaigns on education, empowerment, health, food and shelter.

2020 
Campus Development Week:
The Campus Development Week took place from 20 October 2019 to 25 October 2019. A free workshop on IoT was conducted in collaboration with Siemens: COE on 20 October. A signing campaign named One Less Light was conducted and e-Waste bins were installed at the LHC.

Catalyst:
On 4 December 2019, Pragyan took up the task of imparting basic knowledge of Science, Maths, and English, as well as Origami to the students from Panchayat Union School, Vazhavandankottai.

She Talks:
On 9 February 2020, Pragyan conducted ‘She Talks’ at St.Peter's Institute of Higher Education and Research at Avadi, Chennai. It is a flagship social responsibility initiative that aimed to bring more women into the field of STEM. It also enlightened the participants about the opportunities that accompany their entry into the field.

Shelves of Joy:
Multiple shelves were placed in front of Orion from 26 February 2020, for the students to place books and clothes to be donated.
 
Bag of Delight:
The 6 and 7 March 2020 saw the organization of Bag of Delight, at the 2k Market. Buyers at the market were encouraged to buy things from a list (that are) needed by the students of the Panchayat Union School, Valavanthankottai.

First Step:
The First Step was conducted on 10 March 2020 by the Social Responsibility Wing of Pragyan at the REC School. As a part of the event, free footwear was distributed to the students of the school in memory of Mr. Raghavendra Singh Chauhan, a former head of the Marketing Team.

2019 
Green The Red:
Pragyan, in association with @sbifoundation organized ‘Green the Red’, an awareness program on sustainable menstruation, on 20 February, at the Government High School, Thirunedungulam. Ms. Harini, from RebootU, enlightened the students about the advantages of reusable pads.

First Step:
Pragyan, NIT Trichy in its recent social venture "First Step" distributed 182 pairs of VKC sponsored slippers to students at REC Middle school.

Aval:
As a part of the initiative, volunteers visited a rehabilitation center for blind women, where they engaged in interactions and also distributed 500 sanitary napkins, on the occasion of International Women's Day.

Vallinam:
A self-defense workshop was conducted by AWARE, an NGO from Chennai in Government High school, Thenipatti. Mr. Sandhiyan and Ms. Kavitha gave a 3-hour session which saw an awareness session of Safe and Unsafe behaviors, and how one should be mentally and physically strong to face the situation. They showed various demos on how to protect ourselves and the students were made to practice with each other.

2018 
A disaster management program Raksha was conducted, in which safety procedures, drills, and training were given to school students. Members of the PSR team actively participated in teaching the necessity of safety and awareness. As a part of Uyarum, Pragyan celebrated world environment day on 5 June by distributing seed packets, saplings, and flyers. To mark the Literacy day on 08/09/2017, Karka Kasadara - a program aimed at providing literacy for all was conducted.  Pragyan's social responsibility wing visited schools in and around the locality, collecting books for 'Karka Kasadara'. The final stage of Karka Kasadara was conducted at Hope Foundation Worldwide Orphanage and Anbagam Nalivutra Manavar Manaviyar Vidudhi. The collected books were donated to the orphanage along with kits containing notebooks, pens, and pencils.

Catalyst, held on 19 January 2018, was an initiative where Basic concepts on science were demonstrated through experiments to students class 6th, 7th, and 8th of Thuvakudi government school. Aval, a Menstrual Awareness drive was held on 11 February 2018. Sanitary Napkins were distributed among the women and a presentation on menstrual hygiene was given by the founder of SCOPE foundation to the Women from Vazhavandhan Kottai village.

Foresight, a water conservation awareness drive, was held on 17 February 2018 at LA Cinemas. A video stressing the importance of water conservation was displayed at the theatre along with an activity that involved the opening of sealed Bisleri bottles. Uyir was awareness drive on Organ Donation held 23 February 2018. The event organized by the MOHAN foundation had a presentation regarding various organs and information regarding their transplant provided to the students of NIT Trichy.

2017 
As NIT Trichy's contribution to Rashtriya Aavishkar Abhiyan, PSR invited school children in the neighbourhood to witness and take part in Pragyan 2017. Under the Catalyst initiative, science experiments were demonstrated to students of two neighbouring schools. Pragyan Pizza Project was a pet project of PSR; customers at Domino's Pizza, Trichy were gifted saplings which could be planted in their surroundings.  A fire safety awareness campaign was conducted with help from personnel from Tamil Nadu Fire Rescue Services. A Campus Initiative Week was celebrated in which volunteers of the team took many steps to improve life in the campus. An awareness campaign against the use of high-beam headlights was also conducted.

2016 
The Vigilance Awareness Week at NIT Trichy saw Mr. Senthamarai Kanna, Deputy Inspector General Of Police, Trichy range and Mr.M.G.Devasahayam, retired IAS officer sharing their views on corruption. Under the banner of Catalyst, workshops were conducted and computer application software were taught to school students, aimed at enhancing education through technology. A disaster management awareness program, Raksha, was conducted to prepare school students for facing natural and man-made disasters. A traffic and road safety awareness campaign was also held. The significance of wearing helmets and seat belts was explained through the distribution of cards.

2015 

PSR conducted Catalyst, a one-day workshop on MS Office for the students of Boiler Plant Girls Higher Secondary School in BHEL township. The workshop was held on 1 November 2014. As a year-round project, PSR in association with LEAP (the environment club of the institute) and the Entrepreneurship Cell launched PET Project, an initiative to reduce the wastage of paper in campus. This was launched after considering the enormous paper wastage that occurs in the campus. A collection box was placed in the Octagon (the computer centre) to collect the roll number sheets that are generated for each student with a print command. The sheets were then used for activities such as making note books and helping Self Help Groups by teaching them to make paper products.

Talks on Career Counselling and Cybercrime were conducted by professionals.

2014 
PSR in association with The Third Dimension, the Aeromodeling Club of the NIT Trichy organised an event to spread interest and awareness in science among school students. It was conducted at Tamil Nadu State Government Matriculation Higher Secondary School, Thiruverumbur on 6 December 2013. The event consisted of simple experiments conducted with commonly available things to help the students understand basic concepts that they study in school.  Contact details were provided to the students for further assistance and also to receive study material and college books for entrance exams free of cost as a part of Pragyan Social Responsibility. In a first of its kind initiative in NIT, Trichy, PSR took to pasting stickers in all hostels of NIT, Trichy to spread awareness about conservation of energy.

2013 
Pragyan 2013 saw two events under the wing of PSR, namely, Disha and Wishberry. Disha was a career counselling event that was launched with the sole objective of promoting the importance of technical skills and the need for innovation among the school and college-going crowd. Wishberry was brought out to help improve the infrastructure in a rural government school in Trichy district. As an ode to the world class education the students of NIT-T are provided with, and as a statement of Pragyan's commitment to education, the team proceeded in the quest of trying to fulfill the minimum required infrastructural needs possible at the Government ADW Boys Higher Secondary School located in Pappakurichi Village, Trichy District. A total of around Rs. 95000 was collected from various sources namely, Rs.73000 online and Rs.22000 in-person, from interested contributors.

Square One
Pragyan Square One, formerly known as Outreach, was introduced with the aim of expanding the extent of technological advances and create awareness on scientific utilities in regions across the nation.

2018 
Pragyan Square One was conducted in SKCET, Coimbatore on 7 and 8 October 2017 as well as in Thiagarajar College of Engineering on 9 and 10 September 2017. While the Coimbatore edition featured a 3D printing and a smart grid automation workshops, the edition held in Madurai focused on robot building and automobile architecture. Also events and competitions offering a grand combined prize pool of INR 50,000 were held.

The Square one edition at Mangalore was held on 3 February 2018 at the Sahyadri College of Engineering and Management. This was the third outreach event conducted by Pragyan which saw three events and a workshop on Introduction to Machine Learning.

2017 
For the first time ever, Pragyan Square One was conducted in two cities- Chennai and Kochi. A workshop on Ethical Hacking was conducted at CUSAT, Kochi and workshops on robotics and embedded technology was conducted at SRM University, Kattankulathur Chennai simultaneously on 4 and 5 February 2017. Students were invited to take part in the regional rounds of events like Circuitrix, The Ultimate Manager, Hunt the Code and Pragyan Quiz. The top teams of each event were invited to take part in the national finals which were to be conducted during Pragyan 2017 at NIT Trichy.

2016 
The 2016 edition of Pragyan saw 'Grab to Smash' a robot building contest, a Quadcopter workshop and a quiz event held in Kochi on 16 and 17 January 2016. The Chennai version held on 30 January saw the robot contest, 'Hunt the Code' competition for coding enthusiasts and an 'Ultimate Manager' contest. A design workshop was also held with CAD and Creo.

2015 
The First edition of the Pragyan Square One (2015)  was conducted in Chennai. It took place at the Sathyabama University, Chennai on 1 and 2 November 2014. Four different events were conducted during the course of the programme. This included a guest lecture, the Circuitrix event, the regional prelims of the Pragyan Open Quiz and a hovercraft workshop, conducted by the AeroSapiens, in association with the Third Dimension Aeromodeling club of NIT Trichy. The guest lecture had a turnout of about 250 students. The winners of the regional prelims in the quiz competition got a direct entry to the National Intercollegiate Pragyan Quiz held during Pragyan.

The 2015 edition of Pragyan saw yet another highlight event, the Hackathon conducted in association with Amazon India at Amazon, Hyderabad. The contest was held on 20 and 21 December 2014 and had more than a hundred participants working on various projects. The contest was a theme based one, with "Collaboration Tools" set as the theme of the contest and contestants had to develop mobile and web-based apps that would help people with 'team work'. The prizes were worth a total of ₹90,000.

Previous editions of Pragyan

Special initiatives

Human library
Human Library was a new initiative by Pragyan in 2018 that saw 14 people with their inspiring stories interact with the students. The event held in association with Human Library, Hyderabad was the largest human library conducted by a student-run organisation. The Human Library at Pragyan proved to be an enriching experience, where students were presented with an opportunity to read about various sensitive and thought-provoking issues prevalent in society. The initiative was continued in the following editions.

References 

National Institutes of Technology
National Institute of Technology, Tiruchirappalli
Festivals established in 2005
Technical festivals in India
Culture of Tiruchirappalli